Fear No Evil is a 1969 American made-for-television horror thriller film directed by Paul Wendkos and starring Louis Jourdan.  It and Ritual of Evil (1970) are  unsold pilots for a proposed television series which would have been called Bedeviled.

Plot
The plot focuses on a young man who dies suddenly after purchasing an antique mirror.  The man's widow visits Sorrell but starts to be plagued with strange, eerie dreams in which her husband's image visits her in the mirror.  The psychologist investigates and learns that a sinister cult and ancient magic are involved.

Cast

See also
 List of American films of 1969

References

External links

American television films
1969 television films
1969 films
Television pilots not picked up as a series
Television films as pilots
Films directed by Paul Wendkos
Films scored by Billy Goldenberg